Matany Airstrip  is an airport serving Matany in Moroto District, Uganda. The airport is maintained by Matany Hospital, a private hospital belonging to the Catholic Diocese of Moroto and serving the wider region.

See also
 Transport in Uganda
 
 
 List of airports in Uganda

References

External links
 HERE/Nokia - Matany
 St. Kizito Hospital - Matany 

Airports in Uganda